Steven White may refer to:

Steven A. White (1928-2021), United States admiral
Steven Edward White, Abolitionist Party of Canada candidate
Steven R. White (born 1959), American professor of physics at the University of California at Irvine
Steven V. White (1928–1988), American businessman

See also
Steve White (disambiguation)
Stephen White (disambiguation)
Stephen Whyte (disambiguation)